Nicholas and the Higs is one of several early, unpublished novels by American science fiction author Philip K. Dick. It was written somewhere around 1957 during the waning days of his second marriage, was re-written at the behest of his publisher in 1958, and was then ultimately rejected for publication. The original manuscripts have been lost, and no copies are known to be extant.

Among Dick's numerous lost novels, it represented his earliest full-length literary attempt to blend mainstream literary fiction with science fiction. Up until this time, Dick had written numerous "straight" (non-SF) novels, all rejected for publication, and had published several science fiction novels and numerous short stories, but he regarded his science fiction as "merely something to pay the bills," and kept his genre career separate from his "grown-up" literary aspiration. In this novel, he allegedly attempted to blend the two for the first time.

Plot summary
As with several lost Philip K. Dick novels of this period, all we know about it is an index card synopsis in the files of a publisher who rejected the book. According to Lawrence Sutin's book, Divine Invasions: A Life of Philip K. Dick, (Published 1989) this card was dated 1/3/58 and said:

In a letter dated 1960, Dick himself commented on the theme of the novel:

In later work
As with many of the characters in Dick's unpublished non-SF novels, several of the characters from this book reappeared in several later novels. As usual, these are not actual sequels, but rather are an example of Dick's penchant for re-using unpublished characters in a "same character, different lives" kind of way. For instance, the old, dying mechanic turns up again in The Penultimate Truth (1964), as do both Robert Hig and Nicholas.

References

See also

Bibliography of Philip K. Dick

Novels by Philip K. Dick
Lost books
1950s novels